Lieutenant General Aly Fahmy Mohammed Aly Fahmy (Arabic: علي فهمي محمد علي فهمي), is an Egyptian Army officer, born February 6, 1959, is the son of Field Marshal Mohammed Aly Fahmy, founder and former commander of the Egyptian Air Defense Forces during the October War. He was the Chief of Air Defense Forces Staff. He is currently the Commander of Air Defense Forces.

See also
Mohammed Aly Fahmy

References

Egyptian military personnel
1959 births
Living people
Place of birth missing (living people)